George Sidney (October 4, 1916May 5, 2002) was an American film director and producer who worked primarily at Metro-Goldwyn-Mayer. His work includes cult classics Bye Bye Birdie (1963) and Viva Las Vegas (1964). With an extensive background in acting, stage direction, film editing, and music, Sidney created many of post-war Hollywood’s big budget musicals, such as Annie Get Your Gun (1950), Show Boat (1951), Kiss Me Kate (1953);  Jupiter's Darling (1955), and Pal Joey (1957).  He was also a president of the Screen Directors Guild for 16 years.

A founding partner of Hanna-Barbera animation studio, Sidney introduced the integration of animation into live action, which is immortalized in the dance scene between actor Gene Kelly and Jerry Mouse in Anchors Aweigh (1945). An avid art collector, gardener, musician, painter, and photographer, George Sidney was known for his impeccable sense of style and generosity. His clothing, original scripts, notes, and personal papers are housed in a namesake collection at The Smithsonian National Museum of American History.

Biography

Early life 
George Sidney was born into show business.  His father, Louis “L.K.” Sidney, was the CEO with Loew’s Incorporated theatre chain. An only child, George tagged along with his father to work at Radio City Music Hall, where he learned the art of choreography, set design, and stage direction. His mother, Hazael Mooney, was a famous Vaudeville star and half of the aquacade team, The Mooney Sisters. Sidney attended Riverdale Country School in the Bronx, New York. 

George Sidney absorbed the world of New York City theatre and art. At five years old, George Sidney became the most famous child actor in the world when he played the lead role in The Littlest Cowboy, a 1921 film with western super star, Tom Mix. After a reputed tryst with a showgirl from The Rockettes , George was sent to Los Angeles at age 15 to learn the movie business from his “uncle,” studio head of Metro-Goldwyn-Mayer, Louis B. Mayer. George Sidney began as a dog walker and errand boy in the early 1930s.

Early career at MGM 
Sidney soon learned the art of editing at MGM, where he worked alongside aspiring film maker Fred Zinnemann, who went on to direct From Here to Eternity (1953) and Oklahoma! (1955). By the age of 20, Sidney directed many screen tests, with established and aspiring stars, including Errol Flynn, Tyrone Power, Judy Garland and Ava Gardner. Sidney honed his skills with 85 one-reel shorts—a genre that eventually gave him two Academy Awards with “Quicker’n A Wink” (1940) and “Of Pups and Puzzles” (1941).

In 1938 at age 22, Sidney directed the Our Gang short comedies, which MGM had acquired from Hal Roach upon George’s recommendation. A mere nine years older than his actors, Sidney proved his leadership and moved on to direct the Crime Does Not Pay series and popular Pete Smith specialties.

During World War II, George Sidney was assigned to the Air Force to supervise the Atomic Energy Commission Film Program at Eniwetok, for which received the Certificate of Merit from the Department of Defense and the Plaque of Honor from the United States Air Force. George Sidney was a central figure in the filming of nuclear testing projects.

Feature films 
George Sidney came to the fore of American popular cinema with his blockbuster musical, The Harvey Girls (1946), starring Judy Garland and Angela Lansberry. The film introduced Cyd Charisse in her first speaking part.   Sidney’s adaptions of theatrical works to film include Annie Get Your Gun (1950), Show Boat(1951), Kiss Me Kate (1953); Jupiter’s Darling (1955), and Bye Bye Birdie (1963).  His cast Frank Sinatra in his film Pal Joey(1957).  These lavish productions brought George Sidney international acclaim. Sidney’s romantic comedies, including Key to the City (1949), Who Was That Lady? (1960), and The Swinger (1966) diversified his filmography. His period adventure films, including The Three Musketeers (1948),) and the Oscar-winning Merry Wives of Windsor (1954), earned the respect of his colleagues. Sidney’s personal favorite was Scaramouche (1952), a period piece set in pre-revolutionary France that starred Janet Leigh. 

Sidney left MGM to make The Eddy Duchin Story (1956) at Columbia Pictures where he made his base for the next decade for such films as Jeanne Eagels (1957),Pepe (1960), and Bye Bye Birdie (1963). He returned to MGM to film A Ticklish Affair (1963) and Elvis Presley's Viva Las Vegas (1964). 

In both his technical skill and artistic vision, George Sidney stands among the 20th century’s most celebrated film directors. He was ranked second 11 years later.  Sidney’s dedication to the craft of movie making gave his films a visual intensity that captivated the American public and created the foundation for the big-budget Hollywood productions. Sidney’s final film Half a Sixpence was released in 1967.

Animation 
Sidney became good friends with MGM animation directors William Hanna and Joseph Barbera. Hanna and Barbera's Jerry Mouse appeared alongside Gene Kelly in Sidney's film Anchors Aweigh (1945). After MGM closed its animation studio on May 15, 1957, Sidney helped Hanna and Barbera form a deal with Screen Gems, the television division of Columbia Pictures, to form the successful television animation studio Hanna-Barbera Productions, and was a shareholder in the company. Sidney later featured Hanna-Barbera's Fred Flintstone, Barney Rubble, Huckleberry Hound, and Yogi Bear in Bye Bye Birdie (1963).

In 1961, Sidney appeared as himself, along with the canine Lassie in the episode "The Stones Go to Hollywood" of the sitcom The Donna Reed Show. The episode plugged Sidney's then current feature film Pepe, in which Donna Reed made a cameo.

Professional service, awards and tributes 
Sidney devoted much of his later life to professional service as a mentor to directors, writers, and educators. Sidney became the youngest president of the Directors Guild of America, having been nominated by his friend, director John Ford. A lifelong learner, Sidney attended law school at the University of Southern California and lectured extensively about film production. George Sidney’s work has been celebrated at museums and film festivals around the world: Paris; Barcelona; Helsinki; Moscow; Las Vegas; Palm Springs; Deauville; and Honolulu. He has a star on the Hollywood Walk of Fame. at the Northwest corner of Hollywood Boulevard and Vine. Sidney was nominated for the Directors Guild of America Award four times, starting with the lush Technicolor remake of Show Boat. In 1958, he was presented with a Golden Globe Award for Best World Entertainment through Musical Films. 

Post-humorously, Sidney’s widow, Corinne Entratter Sidney, donated the director’s extensive professional archive to the Smithsonian Institute. These artifacts include scripts with handwritten notes, personal correspondence, and his extensive photography collection spanning Sidney’s 60-year career in the film industry.  A renown clotheshorse, Sidney was routinely on Mr. Blackwell’s Best Dressed List. He was known for his love of Hermes neckwear and British tailoring. His clothing is in the costume collection at Los Angeles County Museum of Art and the State Museum of Nevada Las Vegas.

Personal life 
In his personal life, Sidney was married in 1942 to drama coach, Lillian "Burnsie" Burns Salzer (1903–1998). He was fifteen years her junior. In the late 1970s, he married his second wife, Jane Adler Robinson (d. 1991), who was the widow of actor Edward G. Robinson (1893–1973). In 1991, Sidney married his third wife, actress, model and journalist Corinne Kegley Entratter, also known as Corinne Cole, who was the widow of showman and Las Vegas entrepreneur Jack Entratter. Sidney was a prolific photographer. He collected art and was an avid and skilled gardener. Sidney was a member of the Royal Horticultural Society. He died in Las Vegas, Nevada in May 2002 from lymphoma, at the age of 85.

Awards and nominations

Partial filmography

Further reading

External links 

 
 
 
 George Sidney Collection Finding Aid at the National Museum of American History - https://sova.si.edu/record/NMAH.AC.0867

References 

1916 births
20th-century American Jews
2002 deaths
Film producers from New York (state)
Burials at Hillside Memorial Park Cemetery
Presidents of the Directors Guild of America
Deaths from lymphoma
People from Long Island City, Queens
Deaths from cancer in Nevada
Activists from New York (state)
Film directors from New York City
21st-century American Jews